Luis Enrique Cáceres (born 16 April 1988) is a Paraguayan football midfielder who currently plays for Sport Boys.

Career 

He is distinguished by his smooth handling of the ball in order to create attacking moves for his team. On more than one occasion, the Paraguayan press has considered him the best creation midfielder of Paraguayan football, reaching his consolidation in the 2009 season, in which he highlighted as a figure of his team that won the local title and advanced to the semifinals of the Copa Sudamericana.
One of his most important goals came in a Paraguayan football derby played in 2008, in which he entered at the 66th minute of the game and, 10 minutes from the end, scored the winning goal.

National team

He made his debut for the senior Paraguay national football team in a friendly against South Africa on 26 March 2008. He also joined the U-17 and U-20 during the South American 2005 and 2007, respectively.

Honours

Cerro Porteño
 Primera División de Paraguay: Apertura 2009

Vitória
Campeonato Baiano: 2013

References

External links
 
 Profile in BDFA 
 

1988 births
Living people
Paraguayan footballers
Paraguayan expatriate footballers
Paraguay international footballers
Paraguayan Primera División players
Campeonato Brasileiro Série A players
Campeonato Brasileiro Série B players
Peruvian Primera División players
Cerro Porteño players
Club Libertad footballers
Esporte Clube Vitória players
Coritiba Foot Ball Club players
Club Olimpia footballers
Club Rubio Ñu footballers
Paysandu Sport Club players
Club Sportivo San Lorenzo footballers
Deportivo Capiatá players
Sport Boys footballers
Association football midfielders
Sportspeople from Asunción
Expatriate footballers in Brazil
Expatriate footballers in Peru
Paraguayan expatriate sportspeople in Brazil
Paraguayan expatriate sportspeople in Peru
20th-century Paraguayan people
21st-century Paraguayan people